Bretton Woods Mountain Resort is a ski area located in Bretton Woods, New Hampshire, across from the Mount Washington Hotel, which owns it.

Location and terrain
The resort is located on U.S. Route 302 in the White Mountains of New Hampshire. The terrain occupies  adjacent to the White Mountain National Forest. 92% of the trails have snowmaking. The resort includes 8 lifts, four of which are high speed quads. They run at a capacity of 14,000 people per hour.

Ski lifts

Bretton Woods has eight chairlifts  and two magic carpets.

On-mountain food
Eateries around the ski area include the Top O' Quad Restaurant, Maple Leaf BBQ, West Mountain BBQ, the Food Court, and the Sugar Shack.

Awards
In the 2013/2014 SKI Magazine Reader's Poll, Bretton Woods was named #1 in the East for snow, grooming, service, and weather. Also, Bretton Woods was chosen as the #12 ski resort in the world and the #6 ski resort in the U.S. and Canada by the readers of Condé Nast Traveler. Bretton Woods was named #1 in New Hampshire for lifts, lodging, and dining, and overall ski resort. Bretton Woods was also named Top 5 in the East for family programs and scenery and Top 10 in the East for on mountain food.

References

External links
 Bretton Woods – Official site

Buildings and structures in Coös County, New Hampshire
Buildings and structures in Grafton County, New Hampshire
Ski areas and resorts in New Hampshire
Tourist attractions in Coös County, New Hampshire
Tourist attractions in Grafton County, New Hampshire